Erica Musso (born 29 July 1994) is an Italian swimmer. She competed in the women's 200 metre freestyle event at the 2018 FINA World Swimming Championships (25 m), in Hangzhou, China.

References

External links
 

1994 births
Living people
Italian female freestyle swimmers
Place of birth missing (living people)